Tashedkhons(u)  was a  wife of Pharaoh Osorkon I and the mother of Pharaoh Takelot I. She is known from the Pasenhor stela. Tashedkhonsu is given the title God's Mother on the stela. A shabti inscribed for Tashedkhonsu was found in the tomb of Takelot II, who was a distant descendant.

References

Queens consort of the Twenty-second Dynasty of Egypt
10th-century BC Egyptian women
9th-century BC Egyptian women